Lim Min-hyuk (born 5 March 1994) is a South Korean footballer who plays for Jeonnam Dragons.

References

External links 
 

1994 births
Living people
South Korean footballers
K League 1 players
K League 2 players
Jeonnam Dragons players
K4 League players
Association football goalkeepers